Ifugao or Batad is a Malayo-Polynesian language spoken in the northern valleys of Ifugao, Philippines. It is a member of the Northern Luzon subfamily and is closely related to the Bontoc and Kankanaey languages. It is a dialect continuum, and its four main varieties—such as Tuwali—are sometimes considered separate languages.

Loanwords from other languages, such as Ilokano, are replacing some older terminology.

Dialects
Ethnologue reports the following locations for each of the four Ifugao languages.

Amganad Ifugao: spoken in Hungduan and Banaue municipalities of Ifugao Province, and into southwestern Mountain Province. 27,100 speakers as of 2000. Dialects are Burnay Ifugao and Banaue Ifugao.
Batad Ifugao (Ayangan Ifugao): spoken in central Ifugao Province. There are also some speakers in Isabela Province, on the eastern shore of the Magat reservoir. 10,100 speakers as of 2002. Dialects include Ducligan Ifugao.
Mayoyao Ifugao (Mayaoyaw): spoken in Ifugao Province, (northern Mayoyao, Aguinaldo, and [[Alfonso Lista, Ifugao|Alfonso Lista]] municipalities) and Mountain Province (2 small border areas). 30,000 speakers as of 2007.Tuwali Ifugao''' (Gilipanes, Ifugaw, Kiangan Ifugao, Quiangan, Tuwali): spoken in southern Ifugao Province. 30,000 speakers as of 2000. Dialects are Hapao Ifugao, Hungduan Ifugao, and Lagawe Ifugao.

Phonology

Consonants 

 Other sounds such as /s/ and /r/ occur in loanwords.

Vowels 

 /ʊ/ can also be heard as close-back [u].
 /ə/ does not exist in the Tuwali dialect.
 /i/ can also be heard as [ɪ].

Orthography
The unified Ifugao alphabet is as follows: A, B, D, E, G, H, I, K, L, M, N, Ng, O, P, T, U, W, Y. The letters are pronounced differently depending on the dialect of the speaker.

References

External links 

South–Central Cordilleran languages
Languages of Ifugao